Ronald Howard (7 April 1918 – 19 December 1996) was an English actor and writer. He appeared as Sherlock Holmes in a weekly television series of the same name in 1954. He was the son of the actor Leslie Howard.

Early life
Howard was born in South Norwood, London, the son of Ruth Evelyn (née Martin) and the actor Leslie Howard. He attended Tonbridge School. After graduating from Jesus College, Cambridge, Ronald became a newspaper reporter for a while but decided to become an actor.

Film career
His first film role was an uncredited bit part in Pimpernel Smith (1941), a film directed by and starring his father in the title role, though young Howard's part ended up on the cutting room floor. In the early 1940s, Howard gained acting experience in regional theatre, the London stage and eventually films; his official debut was in 1947's While the Sun Shines. Howard received varying degrees of exposure in some well-known films, such as The Queen of Spades (1949) and The Browning Version (1951). Howard played Will Scarlet in the episode of the same name of the 1950s British television classic The Adventures of Robin Hood starring Richard Greene. The character of Scarlet was later portrayed by Paul Eddington.

The 1954 Sherlock Holmes television series, based on the Arthur Conan Doyle characters and produced by Sheldon Reynolds, ran for 39 episodes starring Howard as Holmes and Howard Marion-Crawford as Watson. In addition to 21st century DVD releases, in 2006 and 2014 this series was broadcast in the UK on the satellite channel Bonanza, before being repeated in May 2021 on Talking Pictures TV.

Howard continued mainly in British "B" films throughout the 1950s and 1960s, most notably The Curse of the Mummy's Tomb (1964), along with a few plum television guest roles in British and American television in the 1960s, including the TV series, Combat! s.2 ep.25: "What Are the Bugles Blowin' For?" - Pt.1 & 2 (1964) Wing Commander Hayes in the 1967 Cowboy in Africa TV show with Chuck Connors and Tom Nardini; two episodes of Boris Karloff's TV series Thriller, S1 E23 "Well of Doom" and S2 E5 "God Grante that She Lye Stille" (both 1961). Of his career in British B films the film historians Steve Chibnall and Brian McFarlane wrote, "Despite his blond good looks (and resemblance to his father) and his agreeable demeanour, he lacked genuine star quality."

In the mid-1970s, he reluctantly put aside his acting career to run an art gallery.

In Search of My Father
In the 1980s he wrote In Search of My Father: A Portrait of Leslie Howard, a biography covering the career and mysterious death of his father, whose plane was shot down over the Bay of Biscay on 1 June 1943. His conclusion (which remains in dispute) was that the Germans' goal in shooting down the plane was to kill his father, who was Jewish and who had been travelling through Spain and Portugal, ostensibly lecturing on film, but also meeting with local activists and shoring up support for the Allied cause.

The Nazis suspected surreptitious activities since German agents were active throughout Spain and Portugal, which, like Switzerland, was a crossroads for persons from both sides of the conflict, but even more accessible to Allied citizens.

The book explores in detail written German orders to the Ju 88 Staffel based in France, assigned to intercept the aircraft, as well as communiqués on the British side that verify intelligence reports of the time indicating a deliberate attack on Howard. Ronald Howard was convinced that the order to shoot down the airliner came directly from Joseph Goebbels, the Nazi Minister of Propaganda, who had been ridiculed in one of Leslie Howard's films, and who believed him to be the most dangerous British propagandist.

Filmography

 Romeo and Juliet (1936) - Minor Secondary Role (uncredited)
 "Pimpernel" Smith (1941) - Minor Role (uncredited)
 While the Sun Shines (1947) - Earl of Harpenden
 Night Beat (1947) - Andy Kendall
 My Brother Jonathan (1948) - Harold Dakers
 Bond Street (1948) - Steve Winter
 The Queen of Spades (1949) - Andrei
 Now Barabbas (1949) - Roberts Bank Cashier
 Double Confession (1950) - Hilary Boscombe
 Portrait of Clare (1950) - Ralph Hingston
 Flesh and Blood (1951) - Purley
 The Browning Version (1951) - Gilbert
 Assassin for Hire (1951) - Detective Inspector Carson
 Night Was Our Friend (1951) - John Harper
 Wide Boy (1952) - Inspector Carson
 Black Orchid (1953) - Dr. John Winnington
 Street Corner (1953) (aka Both Sides of the Law) - David Evans
 Noose for a Lady (1953) - Dr. Evershed
 Glad Tidings (1953) - Corporal Brayne R.A.F.
 Flannelfoot (1953) - Detective Sgt. Fitzgerald
 The Hideout (1956) - Robert Grant
 Drango (1957) - Clay Allen
 Light Fingers (1957) - Michael Lacey
 The House in the Woods (1957) - Spencer Rowland
 I Accuse! (1958) - Capt. Avril
 Gideon's Day (1958) - Paul Delafield
 Moment of Indiscretion (1958) - John Miller
 No Trees in the Street (1959) - Detective Sergeant Frank Collins
  (1959) - Fitzpatrick
 Man Accused (1959) - Bob Jenson
 One Step Beyond (1960), "The Haunting", Series 2, Episode 25
 The Malpas Mystery - Dick Shannon
 The Spider's Web (1960) - Jeremy
 Compelled (1960) - Paul Adams
 The Monster of Highgate Ponds (1961) - Uncle Dick
 The Naked Edge (1961) - Mr. Claridge
 Come September (1961) - Spencer
 Murder She Said (1961) - Eastley
 Fate Takes a Hand (1961) - Tony
 The Spanish Sword (1962) - Sir Richard Clovell
 Skin Game (1962) - Inspector Gordon
 Live Now, Pay Later (1962) - Cedric Mason
 Nurse on Wheels (1963) - Dr. Harold Golfrey
 Operation Mermaid (1963) - Bill Webb
 Siege of the Saxons (1963) - Edmund
 Bomb in the High Street (1963) - Capt. Manning
 The Curse of the Mummy's Tomb (1964) - John Bray
 Combat In episode 'What Are the Bugles Blowin'For? pt 1 and pt 2 (1964) - Captain Johns
 Weekend at Dunkirk (1964) - Robinson
 You Must be Joking (1965) - Cecil
 Africa Texas Style (1967) - Hugo Copp
 Run a Crooked Mile (1969, TV Movie) - Inspector Huntington
 The Hunting Party (1971) - Watt Nelson
 Persecution (1974) - Dr. Ross
 Take a Hard Ride (1975) - Halsey (final film role)

References

Further reading
 In Search of My Father: A Portrait of Leslie Howard, 
 Trivial Fond Records - Leslie Howard (editor),

External links

1918 births
1996 deaths
Alumni of Jesus College, Cambridge
English male film actors
English male stage actors
English male television actors
English people of Hungarian-Jewish descent
People from South Norwood
People educated at Tonbridge School
20th-century English male actors
Male actors from London